Thaakir Abrahams (born 10 January 2000) is a South African rugby union player for the  in Super Rugby. His regular position is wing or fullback.

Abrahams was named in the Sharks squad for both the 2020 Super Rugby season and the subsequent Super Rugby Unlocked competition.

References

South African rugby union players
Living people
2000 births
Rugby union wings
Rugby union fullbacks
Sharks (rugby union) players
Sharks (Currie Cup) players